Tharin may refer to:

 Tharin Gartrell, individual involved in the Barack Obama assassination plot in Denver
 Irène Tharin, French politician